James Kerridge  (4 August 1830 – 28 March 1911) was a British architect based in Wisbech, Cambridgeshire.

Personal life
James Kerridge was born on 4 August 1830 in Bungay, Suffolk, the son of William Kerridge (b. 1806), a farmer, and Hannah Webster (b. 1808), and was baptised aged four on 28 July 1835 in Bungay.

He trained as an architect under C. Weekes of Carmarthen. 

He married first Mary Ann Frances Watford (1836–1857) on 23 July 1854 in St Clement Danes. They had two children:
Revd. William Kerridge (1855–1928)
Catherine Eliza Kerridge (b. 1857)

Mary Ann Frances died in Wisbech and was buried on 20 February 1857. He married secondly Mary Hill (1839-1914) on 14 December 1858 in Wisbech. They had the following children:
James Kerridge (1860 – 12 April 1877)
Mary Ann Frances Kerridge (1862–1938)
John H Kerridge (1864–1865)
Richard Cobden Kerridge (1866 – 6 April 1877)
Hannah Elizabeth Kerridge (b. 1868)
John Mason Kerridge (1870 – 1878)
Francis Kerridge (b. 1871)
Ellen Maria Kerridge (b. 1873)
Catherine Eliza Kerridge (b. 1875)
Florence Kane Kerridge (b. 1876)
Thomas Mallitt Kerridge (b. 1879)
Lucy Priscilli Kerridge (b. 1880)
Gertrude Mabel Kerridge (b. 1882)

He died on 28 March 1911 and was buried in Wisbech General Cemetery.

Works
Primitive Methodist Church, Somerby, Leicestershire, 1863
Primitive Methodist Church, Sileby, Leicestershire, 1866
Primitive Methodist Chapel, Coal Aston, Derbyshire, 1866
Primitive Methodist Chapel, Mosborough, South Yorkshire, 1869
Primitive Methodist Chapel, John Street, Highfield, Sheffield, 1869
Free Methodist Chapel, Wisbech, 1870 (enlargement)
Primitive Methodist Chapel, Haverhill, Suffolk, 1874
Primitive Methodist Church, Stroud Green, 1874
Primitive Methodist Church, New Street, Halsted, Essex, 1875
Primitive Methodist Church, Parkgate, Sheffield, 1875
Primitive Methodist Chapel, Gillingham, Dorset, 1875–76
Primitive Methodist Chapel, Ramsbury, Wiltshire, 1876–77
Primitive Methodist Chapel, Charley Way, Shepshed, 1877–78
Primitive Methodist Church, Alcombe Road, Northampton, 1879
Primitive Methodist Chapel, Mansfield Road, Hasland, Chesterfield, Derbyshire, 1880–81
Primitive Methodist Chapel, Chapel Street, Rawmarsh, 1881
Primitive Methodist Chapel, Forncett St Mary, Norfolk, 1883–84
Littleport Public Hall, 1888-89
Primitive Methodist Chapel, Ashill, Norfolk, 1893
Primitive Methodist Chapel, London Road, Mount Tabor, Luton, Bedfordshire, 1898
Primitive Methodist Chapel, Ramsey, Cambridgeshire 1898
Primitive Methodist Chapel, Hinckley Road, Leicester, Leicestershire, 1899
Primitive Methodist Chapel, Mattishall, Norfolk, 1900

References

1830 births
1911 deaths
British architects
People from Bungay